Agron refers to two surnames with the same spelling, one Jewish and one Hispanic.

Etymology
As such, there are two origins, the Hebrew Agron (אגרון) and (with Slavic suffix) Agronsky, and the Spanish and Galician Agrón.

The Jewish names are patronymics of the biblical Aaron, first high priest of the Jews and brother of Moses, and are two of many Jewish surnames related to him. In the United States, the surname is transliterated from "Ahron" in Eastern Europe usage, though "Agron" and "Ogron" were commonly used in Russia.

The Hispanic name is a habitational surname, directly meaning "by the dry ground" and deriving from two towns of the same name, one in A Coruña and one in Granada.

People
Notable people with the surname include:

Agron journalism family
Gershon Agron (born Agronsky; 1894–1959), American-Israeli journalist and mayor of Jerusalem
Hassia Levy-Agron (1923–2001), Israeli dancer (daughter-in-law of Gershon)
Martin Agronsky (born Agrons; 1915–1999), American journalist (nephew of Gershon)
Alfredo Agron, Filipino-American WWII veteran, centenarian, and Congressional Gold Medal recipient
Bernie Agrons (died 2015), American politician (related to Gershon et al above)
Charles Agron, American filmmaker
Dianna Agron (born 1986), American actress (distantly related to Gershon et al above)
Evsei Agron (died 1985), Russian-American mob boss
Gary Agron, retired United States Army Alaska Chief of Staff (son of Alfredo)
Kimberly Agron, 2015 Miss Alaska USA
Salvador Agron (1943–1986), Puerto Rican gang member

See also
Other surnames derived from Aaron, including:
Aaron (surname)
Aarons (surname)
Baron-Cohen
Cohen (surname)
Goren (surname)

References

Galician-language surnames
Hebrew-language surnames
Patronymic surnames
Russian-Jewish surnames
Spanish-language surnames
Toponymic surnames